National Bank of Dubai (NBD) is a building in Dubai, United Arab Emirates (UAE).  The building, located in eastern Dubai in Deira, houses the headquarters of the National Bank of Dubai.

The building is part of the old downtown of Dubai, along the Dubai Creek. At , the National Bank of Dubai is the tallest building in Deira, and was the fifth-tallest building in Dubai when built in 1998.  The form of the building was inspired by the curved shape of the hulls of the traditional dhows that docked in the Dubai Creek — a concept that also inspired the shape of the Burj Al Arab.

References 

Office buildings completed in 1998
1998 establishments in the United Arab Emirates
Skyscraper office buildings in Dubai
Bank headquarters